is a Japanese footballer.

Club career
Nakagawa made his professional debut on 3 July 2019 in an Emperor's Cup game against Tokushima Vortis.

Career statistics

Club
.

Notes

References

External links

2000 births
Living people
Association football people from Wakayama Prefecture
Japanese footballers
Association football forwards
Cerezo Osaka players
Ehime FC players